Canzo-Asso is a railway station in Italy. It is the end of the Milan–Asso railway.

It serves the town of Asso.

Services 
Canzo-Asso is served by the regional trains operated by the Lombard railway company Trenord.

See also 
 Erba, Lombardy

References

External links 

Railway stations in Lombardy
Ferrovienord stations
Railway stations opened in 1922